Eutropis englei, also known commonly as Engel's mabuya and the six-striped mabouya, is a species of skink, a lizard in the family Scincidae. The species is endemic to Mindanao in the Philippines.

Etymology
The specific name, englei, is in honor of Captain Francis G. Engle (1888–1974) of the United States Coast and Geodetic Survey.

Habitat
The preferred natural habitat of E. englei is low vegetation near mouths of streams and along beaches.

Reproduction
The mode of reproduction of E. englei is unknown.

References

Further reading
Brown WC, Alcala AC (1980). Philippine Lizards of the Family Scincidae. (Silliman University Natural History Monograph Series). City of Dumaguete, Negros Oriental, Philippines: Silliman University. i–xi + 246 pp. (Mabuya englei, p. 120).
Mausfeld P, Schmitz A, Böhme W, Misof B, Vrcibradic D, Freder C (2002). "Phylogenetic Affinities of Mabuya atlantica Schmidt, 1945, Endemic to the Atlantic Ocean Archipelago of Francisco de Noronha (Brazil): Necessity of Partitioning the Genus Mabuya Fitzinger, 1826 (Scincidae: Lygosominae)". Zoologischer Anzeiger 241: 281–293. (Eutropis englei, new combination).
Taylor EH (1925). "Additions to the herpetological fauna of the Philippines, IV". Philippine Journal of Science 26: 97–111. (Mabuya englei, new species, pp. 101–102).

Eutropis
Reptiles described in 1925
Reptiles of the Philippines
Endemic fauna of the Philippines
Taxa named by Edward Harrison Taylor